Johan Petter Åhlén (13 April 1879 – 31 March 1939) was a Swedish businessperson who founded Åhléns. He was also a Swedish curling pioneer and winner of a silver medal in the 1924 Winter Olympics.

Biography
Johan Petter Åhlén was the son of farmers Marits Anders Andersson and Brittas Karin Christoffersdotter. He was born Johan Petter Andersson, but changed his surname to Åhlén after his birthplace (which was called Åhl by the time of his name change) to avoid being confused with numerous namesakes. In 1903 he married Elin Maria Charlotta Brolin and with her he had the sons Gösta Mauritz Åhlén and Anders Ragnar Åhlén, who both became managing directors of his companies. Åhlén died in 1939 while crossing the Atlantic Ocean on a boat trip from New York.

Businessperson
In 1899, Johan Petter Åhlén founded the mail-order company Åhlén & Holm in his hometown, partnered with his uncle Erik Holm. It soon changed name to Insjön and became the leader in its field in Scandinavia. In 1902, Johan Petter Åhlén became the sole owner of the company. In 1906 he and Erik Åkerlund launched another company, the book publishing house Åhlén & Åkerlunds. In 1932, after a study tour to the US, he founded the first department store, at Östermalmstorg in Stockholm.

Curling player
Johan Petter Åhlén was a Swedish curling pioneer, silver medalist at the 1924 Winter Olympics, three-time Swedish champion, and vice president of the Swedish Curling Association in 1935–38.

References

External links

1879 births
1939 deaths
Swedish businesspeople
Swedish male curlers
Olympic curlers of Sweden
Olympic silver medalists for Sweden
Curlers at the 1924 Winter Olympics
Medalists at the 1924 Winter Olympics
Swedish curling champions